(1976) is a Japanese pink film in the Roman Porno series, starring Naomi Tani, directed by Masaru Konuma and produced by Nikkatsu.

Synopsis
A traffic accident brings together the widow Michiyo and her step daughter Takako with Hideo, the young man who caused the accident. Hideo and Takako start a relationship but Michiyo finds out that Hideo is the son of the man who raped her many years earlier. After this discovery, Michiyo's feelings alternate between guilt and excitement and she secretly spies on the young lovers. As atonement she decides to have her "most sensitive areas" tattooed but the pain brings her pleasure. The denouement has Hideo lusting after Michiyo and raping her as his father had done.

Cast
 Naomi Tani as Michiyo
 Takako Kitagawa as Takako
 Shin Nakamaru as Hideo
 Genshu Hanayagi
 Mami Yuki

Availability
Kino International has announced a region 1 DVD release of Tattooed Flower Vase simultaneously with three other Masaru Konuma Roman Porno films, scheduled for November 6, 2007.

See also
 List of Nikkatsu Roman Porno films

Notes

Sources

External links 
 

1976 films
Films directed by Masaru Konuma
Nikkatsu films
Nikkatsu Roman Porno
Japanese pornographic films
Pink films
1970s Japanese-language films
1970s Japanese films